Joseph Herve Jean Ernest Laforce (June 23, 1916 – October 18, 2009) was a Canadian professional ice hockey defenceman who played in one National Hockey League game for the Montreal Canadiens.

Career

Juniors
Laforce played for the Verdun Maple Leafs and the Montreal St. Pats of the Montreal City Hockey League prior to playing in the NHL.

NHL
Laforce played one game as a member of the Montreal Canadiens during the 1942–43 NHL season. He was signed to the team as an injury replacement. He wore jersey #14

QSHL
Laforce went on to play six seasons as a member of the Montreal Royals, a team that played in the Quebec Senior Hockey League where he was known as one of the best playmaking defencemen in the league. before retiring in 1950.

Personal
Laforce died in St. Albert, Ontario on October 18, 2009. He was 93 years old.

See also
List of players who played only one game in the NHL

References

External links

1916 births
2009 deaths
Canadian ice hockey defencemen
Ice hockey people from Montreal
Montreal Canadiens players